The Japanese Jail Historic and Archeological District in Garapan (Saipan), MP, is a historic district that was listed on the U.S. National Register of Historic Places in 2011.  The listing included two contributing structures and 15 contributing sites.  It includes ruins of a jail that was built in 1930 and was used until 1944.

See also 

Japanese Hospital (Saipan), also NRHP-listed in the Northern Mariana Islands

References 

Buildings and structures on the National Register of Historic Places in the Northern Mariana Islands
Jails on the National Register of Historic Places
Archaeological sites in the Northern Mariana Islands
World War II on the National Register of Historic Places in the Northern Mariana Islands